A dispute exists over the legitimacy of the 2003 invasion of Iraq. The debate centers around the question whether the invasion was an unprovoked assault on an independent country that may have breached international law, or if the United Nations Security Council authorized the invasion (whether the conditions set in place after the Gulf War allowed the resumption if Iraq did not uphold to the Security Council resolutions). Those arguing for its legitimacy often point to Congressional Joint Resolution 114 and UN Security Council resolutions, such as Resolution 1441 and Resolution 678. Those arguing against its legitimacy also cite some of the same sources, stating they do not actually permit war but instead lay out conditions that must be met before war can be declared. Furthermore, the Security Council may only authorise the use of force against an "aggressor" in the interests of preserving peace, whereas the 2003 invasion of Iraq was not provoked by any aggressive military action.

There are ongoing debates regarding whether the invasion was launched with the explicit authorization of the United Nations Security Council. The Government of the United States asserts that the invasion was explicitly authorized by Security Council Resolution 678 and thus complies with international law. The Security Council Resolution 678 authorizes UN Member States to "use all necessary means to uphold and implement Resolution 660 and all subsequent relevant resolutions and to restore international peace and security in the area", however there exist different interpretations of its meaning. The only legal jurisdiction to find "aggression" or to find the invasion illegal rests with the Security Council under United Nations Charter Articles 39-42. The Security Council met in 2003 for two days, reviewed the legal claims involved, and elected to be "seized of the matter". The Security Council has not reviewed these issues since 2003. The public debate, however, continues.  Former UN Secretary General Kofi Annan expressed his opinion that the invasion of Iraq was "not in conformity with the UN charter [...] from the charter point of view, [the invasion] was illegal." (See Legality of the Iraq War)

Saddam's record 
While in power, Saddam Hussein invaded Iran in 1980 and began the Iran–Iraq War, which lasted until 1988. Iraq's invasion was backed by the United States who funneled over $5 billion to support Saddam's party and sold Iraq hundreds of millions of dollars worth of military equipment. During the war, Hussein used chemical weapons on at least 10 occasions, including attacks against civilians. In 1990, Iraq invaded Kuwait and began the Persian Gulf War. After the ceasefire agreement was signed between Saddam and the UN in 1991, which suspended the hostilities of the Gulf War, Iraq repeatedly violated 16 different UNSC resolutions from 1990 to 2002. The Iraq Survey Group interviewed regime officials who stated Hussein kept weapon scientists employed and planned to revive Iraq's WMD program after the inspections were lifted, including nuclear weapons. Under UN Resolution 1441, he was given a "final opportunity" to comply, and he again violated the resolution by submitting a false report to UNMOVIC inspectors and continually preventing them from inspecting Iraq's WMD sites.

During the Gulf War, Iraq took foreign civilians hostage on an unprecedented scale. Hussein attempted to use terrorism against the United States during the Gulf War and against former President George H.W. Bush in Kuwait in 1993 for leading the Gulf War against him.  He had a long history of supporting fighters in Palestine by giving money to families of suicide bombers and gave refuge to other fighting groups against neighboring states in the region.

In 1988 the Al-Anfal Campaign took place in Iraqi Kurdistan, and was carried out by the cousin of Saddam Hussein, Ali Hassan al-Majid. A document signed by Ali Hassan al-Majid is quoted as stating, "all persons captured in those villages shall be detained and interrogated by the security services and those between the ages of 15 and 70 shall be executed after any useful information has been obtained from them". This target group covered any male of fighting age. In 1991 after the Iraqi forces were expelled from Kuwait, the regime of Saddam Hussein cracked down on uprisings in the Kurdish north and Shia south. It is stated between this time over 40,000 Kurds and 60,000 or more Shi'ites were executed.

In 2000, two human rights groups, International Federation of Human Rights Leagues and the Coalition for Justice in Iraq, released a joint report documenting the indoctrination of children into a fighting force. These children as young as five were recruited into the Ashbal Saddam or Saddam's Cubs. The children would be separated from their parents and undergo military training. Parents objecting to this recruitment would be executed and children jailed if they failed to comply. These jails were later noted by Scott Ritter in an interview with Time magazine.

Vice President Cheney stated in 2006 that the U.S. would still have invaded Iraq even if intelligence had shown that there were no weapons of mass destruction.  He said Hussein was still dangerous because of his history of using WMD, and taking him out of power "was the right thing to do".

According to Donald Rumsfeld, Saddam Hussein was giving $25,000 to the families of suicide bombers who were aggressive toward Israel.

United Nations 

As part of the 1991 Gulf War ceasefire agreement, the Iraqi government agreed to Security Council Resolution 687, which called for weapons inspectors to search locations in Iraq for chemical, biological and nuclear weapons, as well as weapons that exceed an effective distance of 150 kilometres. After the passing of resolution 687, thirteen additional resolutions (699, 707, 715, 949, 1051, 1060, 1115, 1134, 1137, 1154, 1194, 1205, 1284) were passed by the Security Council reaffirming the continuation of inspections, or citing Iraq's failure to comply fully with them. On September 9, 1998 the Security Council passed resolution 1194 which unanimously condemns Iraq's suspension of cooperation with UNSCOM, one month later on October 31 Iraq officially declares it will cease all forms of interaction with UNSCOM.

The period between October 31, 1998 and the initiation of Operation Desert Fox (December 16, 1998), contained talks by the Iraqi government with the United Nations Security Council. During these talks Iraq attempted to attach conditions to the work of UNSCOM and the International Atomic Energy Agency, which was against previous resolutions calling for unconditional access. The situation was defused after Iraq's Ambassador to the U.N., Nizar Hamdoon, submitted a third letter stating the position of the Iraqi government on October 31 was "void". After weapons inspections resumed, UNSCOM requested arms documents related to weapon usage and destruction during the Iran–Iraq War. The Iraqi government rejected this request because it was handwritten and did not fall within the scope of the UN mandate. The UN inspectors insisted in order to know if Iraq destroyed all of its weapons, it had to know "the total holdings of Iraq's chemical weapons." Further incidents erupted as Iraqi officials demanded "lists of things and materials" being searched for during surprise inspections.

On December 16, 1998, U.S. President Bill Clinton initiated Operation Desert Fox based on Iraq's failure to fully comply with the inspectors. Clinton noted the announcement made by the Iraqi government on October 31, stating they would no longer cooperate with UNSCOM. Also noted was the numerous efforts to hinder UNSCOM officials, including prevention of photographing evidence and photocopying documents, as well as prevention of interviewing Iraqi personnel.

Inspection teams were withdrawn before the Operation Desert Fox bombing campaign and did not return for four years. The United Nations no-fly zone enforced by the United States, United Kingdom and France—also legality disputed—became a location of constant exchange of fire since Iraqi Vice President Taha Yassin Ramadan instructed Iraqi military to attack all planes in the no-fly zone.

A memo written by US Secretary of Defense Rumsfeld dated Nov 27, 2001 considers a US invasion of Iraq. One section of the memo questions "How start?", listing multiple possible justifications for a US-Iraq War, one scenario being "Dispute over WMD inspections—Start thinking now about inspection demands" In late 2002, after international pressure and more UN Resolutions, Iraq allowed inspection teams back into the country. In 2003, UNMOVIC was inspecting Iraq but were ordered out. There is no credible evidence of WMD production (see Duelfer Report) and no WMDs have been found to date after 1991 (See below and WMD in Iraq). George W. Bush has since admitted that "much of the intelligence turned out to be wrong".

The United States offered intelligence from the Central Intelligence Agency and British MI5 to the United Nations Security Council suggesting that Iraq possessed weapons of mass destruction. The U.S. claimed that justification rested upon Iraq's violation of several U.N. Resolutions, most recently UN Security Council Resolution 1441. U.S. president George W. Bush claimed Iraq's WMDs posed a significant threat to the United States and its allies. An inspection team UNMOVIC, before completing its UN-mandate or completing its report was ordered out by the UN because the US-led invasion appeared imminent.

Weapons of mass destruction 

In the past, Iraq had been supplied with chemical weapons and the technology to develop them by Germany, France, United States and the United Kingdom. Saddam used these weapons against Iranian forces in the Iran–Iraq War, and against Kurdish civilians in the Iraqi town of Halabja. In 1990 during the Gulf War Saddam had the opportunity to use these weapons, but chose not to. One of the noted reasons is the Iraqi forces' lack of up to date equipment to protect themselves from the effects, as well as the speed with which the US forces traversed the open desert. From 1991–1998 UNSCOM inspected Iraq and worked to locate and destroy WMD stockpiles. The team was replaced in 1999 with the United Nations Monitoring Verification and Inspection Commission, UNMOVIC.

In 2002, Scott Ritter, a former UNSCOM weapons inspector, heavily criticized the Bush administration and the news media for relying on the testimony of alleged Iraqi nuclear scientist and defector Khidir Hamza as a rationale for invading Iraq.

No militarily significant WMDs have been found in Iraq since the invasion, although several degraded chemical munitions dating to before 1991 have been. On June 21, 2006 a report was released through the United States Senate Select Committee on Intelligence, stating that since 2003, approximately 500 degraded chemical munitions have been discovered dating from before 1991 in Iraq, and "likely more will be recovered." The weapons are filled "most likely" with Sarin and Mustard Gas. However, the U.S. Department of Defense states that these weapons were not in usable condition, and that "these are not the WMDs this country and the rest of the world believed Iraq had, and not the WMDs for which this country went to war."

In January 2006, The New York Times reported that "A high-level intelligence assessment by the Bush administration concluded in early 2002 that the sale of uranium from Niger to Iraq was 'unlikely.'" The Iraqi government denied the existence of any such facilities or capabilities and called the reports lies and fabrications, which was backed by the post-war prima facie case that no WMDs were evident or found.

Former CIA officials have stated that the White House knew before the invasion that Iraq had no weapons of mass destruction, but had decided to attack Iraq and continue to use the WMD story as a false pretext for launching the war. The leaked Downing Street Memo, an internal summary of a meeting between British defense and intelligence officials, states that Bush Administration had decided to attack Iraq and to "fix intelligence" to support the WMD pretext to justify it. A transcript of a secret conversation between President Bush and PM Blair leaked by a government whistleblower reveals that the US and UK were prepared to invade Iraq even if no WMD were found. British officials in the memo also discuss a proposal by President Bush to provoke Iraq, including using fake UN planes, to manufacture a pretext for the invasion he had already decided on. Best evidence of that false intelligence has been Niger uranium story because on March 14, 2003 (before the invasion) it became public knowledge that president Tandja Mamadou's signatory had been forged.

In 2004 the Butler Commission Report concluded that, "on the basis of the intelligence assessments at the time," statements by the British Government "on Iraqi attempts to buy uranium from Africa" were "well-founded." Opponents however consider the Butler Review a whitewash which lacked cross-party support (the panel was appointed by, and reported directly to, the Prime Minister).

The Iraq Intelligence Commission rejected claims that the Bush administration attempted to influence the intelligence community's pre-war assessments of Iraq's weapons programs, but it did not investigate whether the administration misled the public about the intelligence.

Paul R. Pillar, a 28-year veteran of the CIA, wrote in Foreign Affairs that "the method of investigation used by [these] panels—essentially, asking analysts whether their arms had been twisted—would have caught only the crudest attempts at politicization:

Pillar holds that intelligence was "misused to justify decisions already made".

Regime documents captured inside Iraq by coalition forces are reported to reveal Saddam's frustration with weapon inspections. Meeting transcripts record him saying to senior aides: "We don't have anything hidden!" He questions whether inspectors would "roam Iraq for 50 years". "When is this going to end?" he remarks. He tells his deputies in another: "Don't think for a minute that we still have WMD. We have nothing."

Former General Georges Sada maintains the Iraqi leadership ordered the removal of WMD from Iraq to Syria before the 2003 invasion, in spite of the findings by the Iraq Survey Group. Sada left Iraq in 1991, precluding him from having any first-hand knowledge of any such action, and he has provided no evidence to substantiate his claims. The final report on Iraqi weapons of mass destruction, issued by Charles Duelfer, concluded in April 2005 that the hunt for weapons of mass destruction had "gone as far as feasible" and found nothing. However, Duelfer reported though that the search for WMD material turned up nothing that his team was "unable to rule out unofficial movement of limited WMD-related materials"

Countries supporting and opposing the invasion 

Support for the invasion and occupation of Iraq included 49 nations, a group that was frequently referred to as the "coalition of the willing". These nations provided combat troops, support troops, and logistical support for the invasion. The nations contributing combat forces during the initial invasion were, roughly:

Total 297,384 – 99% US & UK

The United States (250,000 84%), the United Kingdom (45,000 15%), Australia (2,000 0.6%), Denmark (200 0.06%), and Poland (184 0.06%), these totals do not include the 50,000+ Iraqi Kurdish soldiers that assisted the coalition. Ten other countries offered small numbers of non-combat forces, mostly either medical teams and specialists in decontamination. In several of these countries a majority of the public was opposed to the war. For example, in Spain polls reported at one time a 90% opposition to the war. In most other countries less than 10% of the populace supported an invasion of Iraq without a specific go-ahead from the UN. According to a mid-January 2003 telephone poll, approximately one-third of the U.S. population supported a unilateral invasion by the US and its allies, while two-thirds supported war if directly authorized by the U.N.

Global protests expressed opposition to the invasion. In many Middle Eastern and Islamic countries there were mass protests, as well as in Europe. On the government level, the war was criticized by Canada, Belgium, Chile, Russia, France, the People's Republic of China, Germany, Switzerland, the Vatican, India, Iraq, Indonesia, Malaysia, New Zealand, Brazil, Mexico, the Arab League, the African Union and many others. Though many nations opposed the war, no foreign government openly supported Saddam Hussein, and none volunteered any assistance to the Iraqi side. Leading traditional allies of the U.S. who had supported Security Council Resolution 1441, France, Germany and Russia, emerged as a united front opposed to the U.S.-led invasion, urging that the UN weapons inspectors be given time to complete their work.

Saudi Foreign Minister Prince Saud said the U.S. military could not use Saudi Arabia's soil in any way to attack Iraq.  After ten years of U.S. presence in Saudi Arabia, cited among reasons by Saudi-born Osama bin Laden for his al-Qaeda attacks on America on September 11, 2001, most of U.S. forces were withdrawn in 2003.

Legality of the invasion 

The legality of the invasion and occupation of Iraq has been widely debated.

The then United Nations Secretary-General Kofi Annan said in September 2004 that: "From our point of view and the UN Charter point of view, it [the war] was illegal."

The Prosecutor of the International Criminal Court reported in February 2006 that he had received 240 communications in connection with the invasion of Iraq in March 2003 which alleged that various war crimes had been committed.

The political leaders of the US and UK at the time argued that the war was legal, and that existing UN Security Council resolutions related to the first Persian Gulf War and the subsequent ceasefire (660, 678), and to later inspections of Iraqi weapons programs (1441), had already authorized the invasion. Critics of the invasion have challenged both of these assertions, arguing that an additional Security Council resolution, which the US and UK failed to obtain, would have been necessary to specifically authorize the invasion.

The Iraq Inquiry in the UK later found that the legal basis for the law was questionable.

The UN Security Council, as outlined in Article 39 of the UN Charter, theoretically has the ability to rule on the legality of the war, but the US and the UK have veto power in the Security Council, so action is highly improbable even if the issue were to be raised. Despite this, the UN General Assembly (UNGA) may ask that the International Court of Justice (ICJ)—"the principal judicial organ of the United Nations" (Article 92)—give either an 'advisory opinion' or 'judgement' on the legality of the war. Indeed, the UNGA asked the ICJ to give an 'advisory opinion' on "the legal consequences arising from the construction of the wall being built by Israel", by its resolution A/RES/ES-10/14, as recently as 12 December 2003; despite opposition from permanent members of the Security Council. It achieved this by sitting in tenth 'emergency special session', under the framework of the 'Uniting for Peace' resolution. The ICJ had previously found against the US for its actions in Nicaragua, a finding the US refused to comply with.

Opposition view of the invasion 

Those who opposed the war in Iraq did not regard Iraq's violation of UN resolutions to be a valid case for the war, since no single nation has the authority, under the UN Charter, to judge Iraq's compliance to UN resolutions and to enforce them. Furthermore, critics argued that the US was applying double standards of justice, noting that other nations such as Israel are also in breach of UN resolutions and have nuclear weapons.

Giorgio Agamben, the Italian philosopher, has offered a critique of the logic of preemptive war.

Although Iraq was known to have pursued an active nuclear weapons development program previously, as well as to have tried to procure materials and equipment for their manufacture, these weapons and material have yet to be discovered. President Bush's reference to Iraqi attempts to purchase uranium in Africa in his 2003 State of the Union address are by now commonly considered as having been based on forged documents (see Yellowcake forgery).

Robert Fisk, Middle East correspondent for The Independent, comments in his book The Great War for Civilisation that history is repeating itself. Fisk, in the Dutch TV news program Nova: "It is not just similar, it is 'fingerprint' the same". In 1917, the UK invaded Iraq, claiming to come "not as conquerors but as liberators". After an insurrection in 1920, "the first town that was bombed was Fallujah and the next town that was laid siege to was Najaf". Then, the British army intelligence services claimed that terrorists were crossing the border from Syria. Prime minister Lloyd George stood up in the house of commons and declared that "if British troops leave Iraq there will be civil war". The British were going to set up a democracy in Iraq. In a referendum, however, a king was 'elected'. "They decided they would no longer use troops on the ground, it was too dangerous, they would use the Royal Air force to bomb villages from the air. And eventually, [...] we left and our leaders were overthrown and the Ba'ath party, which was a revolutionary socialist party at the time—Saddam Hussein—took over. And I'm afraid that the Iraq we are creating now is an Iraq of anarchy and chaos. And as long as we stay there, the chaos will get worse."

Christian opposition to war 
Pope John Paul II spoke out against the war several times, and said that a war against Iraq would be a "disaster" and a "crime against peace." During the buildup to the war, one hundred Christian scholars of ethical theory issued a statement condemning the war as morally unjustifiable. Their brief statement, which was published in the Sept. 23 edition of the [Chronicle of Higher Education], read as follows: "As Christian Ethicists, we share a common moral presumption against a preemptive war on Iraq by the United States." The group included scholars from a wide array of universities, including traditionally left-leaning Ivy League schools as well as more conservative institutions such as Lipscomb University, in Nashville, Lubbock Christian University, in Lubbock, Tex. (both affiliated with the Churches of Christ), and the Baptist Theological Seminary at Richmond. Other scholars of the just war theory asserted that war with Iraq could be justified on the grounds of defense of a "helpless other." This position is based on the position that war could be justified on the grounds of liberating a helpless people being victimized by a tyrannical ruler.

See also 
 At the Center of the Storm: My Years at the CIA
 Command responsibility
 Democide
 Invasion of Iraq
 Jus ad bellum
 Rationale for the Iraq War
 War on Terrorism
 List of United Nations Security Council resolutions concerning Iraq
 Movement to impeach George W. Bush
 The Prosecution of George W. Bush for Murder
 Opposition to the 2003 Iraq War
 Views on the 2003 invasion of Iraq
 War crimes
 War of aggression
 War crimes committed by the United States

References

External links 
 CIA’s final report: No WMD found in Iraq
 Children as "Collateral Damage" of the War in Iraq
 Could Bush Be Prosecuted for War Crimes?

Iraq War legal issues
2003 invasion of Iraq
Stances and opinions regarding the Iraq War